A recreation ground is a type of park.

Recreation Ground is the name of the following stadiums in the United Kingdom:
Recreation Ground (Aldershot), the home ground of Aldershot Town F.C., located in Aldershot, England
Recreation Ground, Banstead, a cricket ground in Banstead, Surrey, England
Recreation Ground (Bath), the home ground of Bath Rugby, located in Bath, England
Recreation Ground (Caersws), a multi-use stadium in Caersws, Wales
Recreation Ground (Chesterfield), the home ground of Chesterfield F.C., located in Chesterfield, England
 Recreation Ground (Holbeck), a former cricket ground in Holbeck, Leeds, England
 The Recreation Ground, Kington, a cricket ground in Kington, Herefordshire, England
Recreation Ground, Llansantffraid-ym-Mechain, the former home ground of The New Saints, located in Llansantffraid-ym-Mechain, Wales
 Recreation Ground, Long Eaton, a former multi-use sports ground in Long Eaton, Derbyshire, England
 Recreation Ground, Torquay, a former First-class cricket ground located in Torquay, Devon, England
 Recreation Ground (Whitehaven), the home ground of Whitehaven Rugby League Football Club
 New Recreation Ground, the former home ground of Grays Athletic F.C., in Grays, Essex, England
 The Old Recreation Ground, a former football stadium in Hanley, Stoke-on-Trent, England
 Recreation Ground, Oudtshoorn, cricket ground in South Africa

See also
)
Recreation Park (disambiguation)